The United Kingdom held a national pre-selection to choose the song that would go to the Eurovision Song Contest 1967. It was held on 25 February 1967 and presented by Rolf Harris. Harris's weekly show had been the showcase for the five songs in the competition, which had been performed in successive weeks prior to the final. Harris himself would be the BBC's commentator for the final in Vienna.

The internal BBC selection of Sandie Shaw as the singer was something of a departure; in recognition of changing trends in the contest, she was arguably the first real "pop" star to be chosen as the UK representative. Shaw and her manager Eve Taylor were permitted to select one of the finalists, submitting "Had a Dream Last Night", written by her regular songwriter and producer Chris Andrews, who had previously had a song in the 1965 UK final, "One Day", performed by Kathy Kirby. Shaw had recorded a version of that track herself. Viewers voted on postcards via mail to decide the winner and the chosen song was "Puppet on a String". After placing second five times, the UK finally won Eurovision 10 years after the nation's first entry performed by Patricia Bredin in 1957.

Shaw released all five songs from the contest, with the winner featuring the runner up on the B-side of a single that reached No.1 in the single chart for three weeks and selling in excess of 4,000,000 copies worldwide. Some estimates make this the biggest selling single globally by a British female artist. In Germany it sold in excess of 1,000,000 copies and was the biggest selling single of the year. Shaw also released an extended play maxi single featuring four of the five finalists, excluding the winner. This EP titled Tell The Boys, reached No.4 in the EP chart top 10. Shaw later recorded all five songs in Spanish, Italian, French and German. Eventually, all the various recordings of all five songs became available on various CD compilations.

Before Eurovision

A Song for Europe 1967

At Eurovision

Voting 
Every country had a jury of ten people. Every jury member could give one point to his or her favourite song.

References

1967
Countries in the Eurovision Song Contest 1967
Eurovision
Eurovision